Kingston Mill, Stockport is a mid nineteenth century cotton spinning mill in Edgeley, Stockport, Greater Manchester, England. It was taken over by the Lancashire Cotton Corporation in the 1930s and passed to Courtaulds in 1964. Production finished, it was made over to multiple uses.

Location
Stockport is a large town in Greater Manchester, England. Stockport is the largest settlement of the Metropolitan Borough of Stockport, and has a population of 136,082, the wider borough having 281,000.

Historically a part of Cheshire, Stockport in the 16th century was a small town entirely on the southbank of the Mersey, and known for the cultivation of hemp and rope manufacture and in the 18th century the town had one of the first mechanised silk factories in the United Kingdom. However, Stockport's predominant industries of the 19th century were the cotton and allied industries. Chestergate was the main east west road following the south bank of the Mersey, leading not surprisingly to Chester. Kingston Mill was about 500m east of Mersey Square.

History
Stockport was influential in the early stages of the industrial revolution. From 1780 it was a centre of the water powered industry. From 1790 Stockport mills pioneered the use of steam. By 1800, Stockport exceeded Chester in size. The firm of Peter Marsland had become the largest cotton spinner in the region having 87,172 spindles- more than McConnel and Kennedy, Ancoats and Murrays' Mills in Ancoats. It was Stockport that pioneered the steam driven power loom. Then in 1830, the growth stalled, there were a series of strikes in 1802, 1829, and 1844. Significant mills, at this time were the Oldknow Mills, Hillgate, Orrells Mill in Heaton Norris and Houldsworth Mill, Reddish. Kingston mill was built at this time on Chestergate. In the final revival, after the cotton famine when private owners refinanced themselves by the means of joint-stock company flotations, Stockport built two of the industries largest mills Broadstone No.2 Mill with 138,000 mule spindles, and the Stockport Ring Mill No. 2 with 72,000 ring spindles.

In 1901 there was a fire at Kingston Mill. As a result, there was a universal adoption of sprinkler systems. These were fed by water from the water tower, and a supplementary tank on the roof.

The industry peaked in 1912 when it produced 8 billion yards of cloth. The great war of 1914–1918 halted the supply of raw cotton, and the British government encouraged its colonies to build mills to spin and weave cotton. The war over, Lancashire never regained its markets. The independent mills were struggling. The Bank of England set up the Lancashire Cotton Corporation in 1929 to attempt to rationalise and save the industry. Kingston Mill, Stockport was one of 104 mills bought by the LCC, and one of the 53 mills that survived through to 1950. In 2010, Kingston Mill still stands and it is in multiple industrial use.

Usage
In 1891 Kingston Mill had 33,460 spindles, 38/458. In 1951 it was producing coarser ring spun yarns from 10's to 24's

Owners
Lucas Micholls, and Co,(1891)
Lancashire Cotton Corporation (1930s-1964)
Courtaulds (1964-

Tenants
Cosmopolitan Photo Engravers occupied the second floor of Kingston from 1969 to 1975

See also

Textile manufacturing

References

Bibliography

External links
 Cottontown.org website
 Spinningtheweb.org website

Textile mills in the Metropolitan Borough of Stockport
Buildings and structures in Stockport
Former textile mills in the United Kingdom
Textile mills owned by the Lancashire Cotton Corporation